Ropica fuscoplagiata is a species of beetle in the family Cerambycidae. It was described by Breuning in 1973.

References

fuscoplagiata
Beetles described in 1973